Canute or Knud Valdemarsen (1207 – 1260) was an illegitimate son of King Valdemar II of Denmark, who became Duke of Revelia, Blekinge and Lolland.

Canute was the son of the king by his mistress, Helena Guttormsdotter, widow of Danish nobleman Esbern Snare and daughter of Guttorm, Riksjarl of Sweden. His father gave him lands in Estonia as a hereditary duchy in 1219. He was made Duke of Reval (Tallinn) in 1219, but was dispossessed as Denmark were thrown out by the Estonians in 1227. As compensation, he was given Blekinge in 1242, which he held until his death. Canute supported the younger rebel brothers, Abel and Christopher, against King Eric IV of Denmark in 1246, and was imprisoned at Stegeborg Castle. The king forced him to exchange Blekinge temporarily for Lolland, but Blekinge was soon restored to Canute's possession.

Canute left two sons Erik Knudsen Skarsholm (died 1304) and Lord Svantepolk Knudsen (died 1310), as well as a daughter who is said to have married a Folkung. Canute's land of Blekinge, with Lister, was given to his great-grandson lord Knut Folkason in the 1330s by King Magnus VII of Norway. Lord Knut's heirs continued to claim the lordship.

Citations and references

Cited sources

House of Estridsen
Illegitimate children of Danish monarchs
Burials at St. Bendt's Church, Ringsted
1260 deaths
Medieval Danish nobility
13th-century Danish people
Dukes of Estonia
Dukes of Lolland
Year of birth uncertain
1207 births
Sons of kings